Werner Liebknecht (born 1 June 1905 in Waltershausen) was a German engineer and Beamter who was Director of Engineering at Referat Wa Prüf 7 of the Waffenamt during World War II and who was responsible for the design and development of many of the cryptographic devices used by German Armed Forces during World War II, including the cipher teleprinter attachment, the SZ 40 and the Siemens and Halske T52 secure teleprinter.

Life
From 1911 to 1925, Liebknecht was initially Homeschooled before attending secondary education in  attended  Volksschule in Sonnenberg. Between 1925 and 1927, he studied Electrical engineering at the Technical University of Munich and between 1927 and 1931 he studied Communications engineering at Technical University of Berlin, and graduated with a Dipl.-Ing.

In February 1932 to May 1932, Liebknecht worked at the Heinrich Hertz Institute within the Broadcast Receiver section. From June 1932 to December 1936 Liebknecht worked at the Technical University of Berlin as Assistant to the Lecturer for wire communication techniques. In May 1936, he became Director of Engineering.

War work
From January 1937 to 9 April 1945 Liebknecht worked at the Waffenamt, Group WA Prüf 7 Section II in Wire Communication Techniques. His work on speech encipherment involved working on technical questions of speech (Ciphony) and on Wireless telegraphy and on telegraphy in general, Liebknecht conducted engineering design on teletype encoding of the SZ40 and SZ42 for the Germany Army. From 1 May 1942 to 9 April 1945 Liebknecht moved to Group WA Prüf 7 Section III in Wireless Communication Techniques. From 1 April 1942 to 1 July 1943 Liebknecht undertook the same field of work as in Liebknecht Section II. From 1 July 1943 to 9 April 1945, Liebknecht's field of work expanded to include hand encoding devices before he moved to WA Prüf 7/IV, Interception of Eneny Signals to work with Dr. Puff.

As Director of Engineering, his main field of work was on the technical work on speech scrambling.

References

Engineers from Thuringia
1905 births
Year of death missing
People from Gotha (town)